
Lac Brenet is a lake in the Vallée de Joux, canton of Vaud, Switzerland. It is located north of the Lac de Joux, only 200 metres away. Its elevation of 1002 metres is 2 metres below that of Lac de Joux.

The lake used to drain naturally underground and the water resurfaced at the source of the Orbe River. Today the lake is used as a reservoir of the hydroelectric plant at Vallorbe.

See also
List of lakes of Switzerland
List of mountain lakes of Switzerland

External links

Reservoirs in Switzerland
Lakes of the canton of Vaud
L Lac Brenet